Black is the Night (Mavri einai i nychta) or The Klepht (O Kleftis) is a marching song of the Hellenic Army. The lyrics are by Alexandros Rizos Rangavis. The music is based on a Bavarian military march.

Lyrics

Military marches
Hellenic Army
Greek patriotic songs